Tapiwa Marobela (born 30 April 1987) is a former Botswana female tennis player.

Playing for Botswana in Fed Cup, Marobela has a W/L record of 8–16.

Marobela before she attended Florida State University from 2004 to 2008.

ITF Junior Finals

Singles Finals (2–1)

Doubles finals (4–4)

References

External links 
 
 
 

1987 births
Living people
Botswana female tennis players
Florida State Seminoles women's tennis players